Heinrich Kurz (died 1557) was a Roman Catholic prelate who served as Auxiliary Bishop of Passau (1526–1557).

Biography
On 14 Mar 1526, Heinrich Kurz was appointed during the papacy of Pope Clement VII as Auxiliary Bishop of Passau and Titular Bishop of Chrysopolis. He served as Auxiliary Bishop of Passau until his death on 21 Jul 1557.

References 

16th-century Roman Catholic bishops in Bavaria
Bishops appointed by Pope Clement VII
1557 deaths